The following lists events that happened during 1936 in South Africa.

Incumbents
 Monarch: King George V (until 20 January), King Edward VIII (starting 20 January).
 Governor-General and High Commissioner for Southern Africa: The Earl of Clarendon.
 Prime Minister: James Barry Munnik Hertzog.
 Chief Justice: John Wessels then John Stephen Curlewis.

Events

February
 Trolleybuses (trackless trams) begin to operate in Cape Town.

April
 7 – The Representation of Natives Act no 16 of 1936 is passed, the first of a series of laws to diminish the voting rights of non-Whites in the Cape Province.

July
 2 – Die Vaderland, the first Afrikaans daily newspaper in Transvaal, begins publishing in Johannesburg.

September
 15 – The Empire Exhibition, South Africa opens in Johannesburg.

Unknown date
 The Castle of Good Hope in Cape Town is proclaimed a National Monument.

Births
 22 January – Clive Derby-Lewis, politician, played a role in the assassination of South African Communist Party leader Chris Hani (d. 2016)
 18 March – F. W. de Klerk, 10th State President of South Africa (1989–1994).
 20 June – Dick Lord, South African Air Force and Fleet Air Arm fighter pilot. (d. 2011)
 21 June – Lionel Davis, artist, in Cape Town.
 26 September – Winnie Madikizela-Mandela, Apartheid Activist South Africa (d. 2018)
 22 October – Neville Alexander in Cradock. (d. 2012)

Deaths
 2 July – Lionel Phillips, mining magnate, chairman of the South African Chamber of Mines and politician, at Vergelegen, Somerset West. (b. 1855)

Railways

Railway lines opened

 1 May – Natal – Point to Congella, .
 15 June – Cape – Palingpan to Manganore, .
 30 June – Cape – Postmasburg to Lohatla, .

Locomotives
 The South African Railways builds the first two of 24 Class ES centre-cab electric shunting locomotives in its Pietermaritzburg shops, based on the Class 1E mainline electric locomotive.

References

History of South Africa